China–Suriname relations are the bilateral relations between the Republic of Suriname and the People's Republic of China. China has an embassy in Paramaribo. Suriname has an embassy in Beijing.

Human Rights
In June 2020, Suriname was one of 53 countries that backed the Hong Kong national security law at the United Nations.

References

 
Suriname
Bilateral relations of Suriname